Fredrick is a surname. Notable people with the surname include:

 Norton Fredrick (1937–2011), Sri Lankan cricketer
 Zam Fredrick (born 1959), American basketball player